Laurent-Guillaume de Koninck (3 May 1809 – 16 July 1887) was a Belgian palaeontologist and chemist, born at Leuven.

He studied medicine in the university of his native town, and in 1831 he became assistant in the chemical schools. He pursued the study of chemistry in Paris, Berlin and Gießen, and was subsequently engaged in teaching the science at Ghent and Liège. In 1856 he was appointed professor of chemistry in the Liège University, and he retained this post until the close of his life.

About the year 1835 he began to devote his leisure to the investigation of the Carboniferous fossils around Liège, and ultimately he became distinguished for his researches on the palaeontology of the Palaeozoic rocks, and especially for his descriptions of the molluscs, brachiopods, crustaceans and crinoids of the Carboniferous limestone of Belgium. In recognition of this work the Wollaston medal was awarded to him in 1875 by the Geological Society of London, and in 1876 he was appointed professor of palaeontology at Liège. In 1882, he was elected as a member to the American Philosophical Society.

He was awarded the Clarke Medal by the Royal Society of New South Wales in 1886.

Publications:
Eléments de chimie inorganique (1839)
Description des animaux fossiles qui se trouvent dans le terrain Carbonifère de Belgique (1842–1844, supp. 1851)
Recherches sur les animaux fossiles (1847, 1873)
See Notice sur LG de Koninck, by E Dupont; Annuaire de l'Aced. roy. de Belgique (1891), with portrait and bibliography.

References

1809 births
1887 deaths
Belgian paleontologists
Scientists from Leuven
Academic staff of the University of Liège
Belgian chemists
Wollaston Medal winners